Musarrat Hussain was a Pakistani psychiatrist. He was the head of the department of psychiatry at JPMC (Jinnah Post Graduate Medical Centre), Karachi, Pakistan. He died on 3 August 2011 at Agha Khan Hospital Karachi.

In order to pay tribute to his services for the society Prof Musarrat Hussain Memorial Psychiatric Symposium was held in Karachi from 22–24 June 2012.

References

Other links
 http://www.dawn.com/2011/08/28/dr-musarrat-hussain-remembered.html
 https://archive.today/20130201185216/http://profmusarrat-symp.com/index.html
 https://web.archive.org/web/20170716044147/http://www.pulsepakistan.com/archives/15_07_2012/news4.htm

1949 births
2011 deaths
Pakistani psychiatrists